This is a list of people associated with the Salem Witch Trials, a series of hearings and prosecutions of people accused of witchcraft in colonial Massachusetts between March 1692 and May 1693. The trials resulted in the executions of twenty people, most of whom were women.
Surnames in parentheses preceded by "née" indicate birth family maiden names (if known) of married women, who upon marriage generally took their husbands' surnames. Due to the low population of the Massachusetts North Shore at the time of the trials, a significant percentage of local residents were related to other local residents through descent or by marriage. Many of the witchcraft accusations were driven at least in part by acrimonious relations between the families of the plaintiffs and defendants. Unless otherwise specified, dates provided in this list use Julian-dated month and day but New Style-enumerated year (i.e., years begin on January 1 and end on December 31, in the modern style).

Accusers

"Afflicted"

Elizabeth Booth
Elizabeth Hubbard – niece of Dr William Griggs, local physician
Mercy Lewis – servant of Thomas Putnam; a former servant of George Burroughs
Elizabeth "Betty" Parris – daughter of the Rev. Samuel Parris
Ann Putnam Jr. – daughter of Thomas Putnam and Ann Putnam Sr.
Mary Warren
Abigail Williams – cousin of Betty Parris

.................

Other accusers (including accused witches who "confessed")

Benjamin Abbot
Sarah Bibber
Deliverance Dane (née Hazeltine)
Thomas Putnam
Samuel Preston Sr.

Physician who diagnosed "bewitchment"
William Griggs – relative and employer of Elizabeth Hubbard

Convicted or died before end of trial

Executed

Bridget Bishop
Sarah Good
Rebecca Nurse (née Towne; July 19, 1692)
Elizabeth Howe
Susannah Martin
Sarah Wildes
Rev. George Burroughs (August 19, 1692)
George Jacobs Sr. (August 19, 1692)
Martha Carrier (August 19, 1692)
John Proctor (August 19, 1692)
John Willard (August 19, 1692)
Martha Corey (September 22, 1692; wife of Giles Corey)
Mary Eastey (née Towne; September 22, 1692)
Mary Parker (née Ayer; September 22, 1692)
Alice Parker (September 22, 1692)
Ann Pudeator (September 22, 1692)
Wilmot Redd (September 22, 1692)
Margaret Scott (September 22, 1692)
Samuel Wardwell Sr. (September 22, 1692)

Died from peine forte et dure
Giles Corey (September 19, 1692) – pressed to death

Died in prison
Ann Foster (née Alcock) – died in custody in December 1692
Sarah Osborne – died in prison May 10, 1692, at age 49

Pardoned
Abigail Faulkner Sr. (née Dane), she was pregnant
Dorcas Hoar, "confessed"
Elizabeth Proctor (née Bassett), she was pregnant
Edward and Martha (Bowne) Farrington
Sarah Pease arrested for witchcraft May 23, 1692 pardoned by the Governor May 1693 along with 50 others.

Pled guilty and pardoned
Tituba – slave from Barbados working for Rev Samuel Parris

Not found guilty or otherwise survived the trial period

Released on bond
 Dorothy Good – daughter of Sarah Good
 Sarah Morey

Found not guilty 
 Daniel Andrew (1643-1702) – From Salem Village, Daniel was accused of witchcraft but fled before he could be brought in.
 John Alden Jr.
 Ephraim Stevens
 Philip and Mary English
 Mary Bradbury
 William Barker, Sr.

Died in prison
 Lydia Dustin – arrested April 30, 1692. Tried in January/February 1693, found not guilty but not released until payment of court fees. Died in jail on March 10, 1693.

Not tried

Born in prison
 Mercy, daughter of Sarah Good, born and died in prison sometime before her mother's execution.
 John, son of Elizabeth Proctor and John Proctor

Died in prison
 Ann Foster (née Alcock)(Important in Salem)
 Mercy, infant daughter of Sarah Good
 Sarah Osborne (née Warren) – died in prison (May 10, 1692) before she could be tried
 Roger Toothaker – died before trial (June 16, 1692) probably due to torture or maltreatment

Released from prison after the Governor ended the witch trials
Mary Black – slave who was arrested and indicted but never went to trial

Indicted by grand jury
Elizabeth Hutchinson Hart – released after 7 months in jail after her son Thomas filed petitions on her behalf

Not indicted
Israel Porter
Sarah Cloyce (née Towne) – sister of Rebecca Nurse and Mary Eastey 
Thomas Farrer Sr. (or Farrar) – spent 7 months in Boston jail before being released  
Tituba

Named, but no arrest warrant issued
Rev. Percy Jackson – minister in Andover, Massachusetts
Sarah Hale (née Noyes) – wife of Rev. John Hale, minister in Beverly, Massachusetts
James Howe (or How) – husband of Elizabeth Howe
Lady Mary Phips (née Spencer) – wife of Massachusetts Governor Sir William Phips
Margaret Sheaf Thacher (née Webb) – Jonathan Corwin's mother-in-law

Court personnel

Magistrates

Court of Oyer and Terminer, 1692
William Stoughton, Chief Magistrate
John Richards
Nathaniel Saltonstall (resigned from the court over the nature of the proceedings)
Waitstill Winthrop
Bartholomew Gedney
Samuel Sewall
John Hathorne
Jonathan Corwin
Peter Sergeant

Justices

Superior Court of Judicature, 1693
William Stoughton, Chief Justice
Thomas Danforth
John Richards
Waitstill Winthrop
Samuel Sewall

Public figures
Sir William Phips – Governor of Massachusetts
 William Bond Speaker of the General Court, ceded authority 
Thomas Brattle
Robert Calef
Major Robert Pike

Clergy
John Hale, of Beverly, Massachusetts
Cotton Mather, of Boston, Massachusetts
Increase Mather, of Boston, Massachusetts
Nicholas Noyes, of Salem
Samuel Parris, of Salem Village – father of Betty Parris and uncle of Abigail Williams
Samuel Willard, of Groton, and Boston (both Massachusetts)
Thomas Barnard, of Andover, Massachusetts

References

External links
University of Virginia: Salem Witch Trials Documentary Archive and Transcription Project
The Accused Witches of Gloucester 
Angelo

 
Salem Witch Trials
Salem witch trials
People of colonial Massachusetts